Peere may be,

Peere language

People
William Peere Williams (disambiguation), several people
Abraham van Peere